The thick-billed berrypecker (Rhamphocharis crassirostris) is a species of bird in the berrypecker and longbill family Melanocharitidae.
It is found in New Guinea.
Its natural habitat is subtropical or tropical moist montane forest. The spotted berrypecker (Rhamphocharis piperata) was formerly considered conspecific (with both species being grouped under the common name "spotted berrypecker" but with the scientific name R. crassirostris), but it was split as a distinct species by the IOC in 2021.

References

thick-billed berrypecker
Birds of Papua New Guinea
thick-billed berrypecker
Taxonomy articles created by Polbot